is an island city grouped in Nagasaki Prefecture, Japan. It is the only city of Tsushima Subprefecture and it encompasses all of Tsushima Island, which lies in the Tsushima Strait north of Nagasaki on the western side of Kyushu, the southernmost mainland island of Japan. As of March 2017, the city has an estimated population of 31,550 and a population density of 45 persons per km2. Its total area is 708.61 km2, 17.3% of the area of Nagasaki Prefecture.

History

 
An Imperial decree in July 1899 established Izuhara, Sasuna, and Shishimi as open ports for trading with the United States and the United Kingdom.

On April 1, 1975, Toyotama Village was promoted to the status of a town. Mine Village was also elevated to the status of a town in the following year.

The modern city of Tsushima was established on March 1, 2004, from the merger of six towns on Tsushima Island: Izuhara, Mitsushima, and Toyotama (all from Shimoagata District), and Mine, Kamiagata, and Kamitsushima (all from Kamiagata District). Both districts were dissolved as a result of this merger.

Geography
The city of Tsushima is located on Tsushima Island and other small neighbouring islands, lying slightly to the west side of Tsushima Strait, south of the Sea of Japan and north-east of the East China Sea. The island also lies between the Korean Peninsula and the Japanese mainland. Its coastline has a total length of 915 km. Asō Bay, a prominent bay with a rias coastline, is located between the islands. Tsushima lies about 60 km from Iki, 138 km from the city of Fukuoka, and 49.5 km from Busan, South Korea.

Islands
Several other islands encompass Tsushima city, in addition to Kamino-shima and Shimono-shima, both of which makes up the Tsushima Island(s):
 Santsu-jima (三ッ島)
 Shimayama-jima (島山島)
 Uni Island

Flora and fauna

Tsushima cat
Native to the island is the Tsushima cat (or Tsushima leopard cat, an endemic subspecies of the leopard cat, Prionailurus bengalensis). Present on the islands since ancient times, its numbers have decreased sharply, and it is now listed as an endangered species. , it was estimated that only 80 to 100 animals remain.

Climate
Tsushima has a humid subtropical climate (Köppen climate classification Cfa) with very warm summers and cool winters. Precipitation is significant throughout the year, but is much heavier in summer than in winter.

Demographics and culture
The population of Tsushima Island has been decreasing significantly. Between the years of 1995 and 2000, the decline was 5.2%. As nuclear families replace the traditional extended families, the average household is smaller, as is the total population. The elderly comprise nearly a quarter of the population here, compared to 20.8% of the Nagasaki Prefecture as a whole, and 17.3% of the population of Japan.

Religious traditions on Tsushima Island mirror those of the rest of Japan, with a majority of the population adhering to Buddhism or Shinto.

Economy
Many Tsushima residents are employed as fishermen. It is also known for its pearl culture. The natural environment of the Tsushima Islands also contributes to the local tourism industry. Beaches are crowded with tourists in the summer.

Transportation

Airport
Tsushima Airport (TSJ) is approximately 10 km (6.2 mi) northeast of the city.

Seaport
Tsushima has two sea ports, Izuhara and Hitakatsu. Ferries cross to the port of Hakata on Kyūshū a few times per day. Ferries also travel a few times a week to Busan in South Korea.

Road
 Japan National Route 382

Sister cities
Guam (United States of America)
Busan (South Korea)

See also
History of Japan
Oei Invasion (応永の外寇)
Japanese invasions of Korea (1592–1598)
Battle of Tsushima
So clan
Tsushima Fuchu domain

Notes

External links

 Tsushima City English Webpage
 A Profile of Tsushima city

Japanese
 Map of Tsushima, general overview
 Tsushima's Statistics
 Tsushima Airport
 Old pictures of Tsushima
 Tsushima Tourist and Product Society

Korean
 Tsushima Tourist and Product Society

Cities in Nagasaki Prefecture
Port settlements in Japan
Populated coastal places in Japan